The men's 4 × 100 metre freestyle relay event at the 2016 Summer Olympics took place on 7 August at the Olympic Aquatics Stadium.

Summary
Four years after losing the Olympic gold to the Frenchmen in this event, the U.S. men's team was able to get back on top of the podium at these Games. Holding a tight race against the field on the lead-off leg by Caeleb Dressel (48.10), Michael Phelps threw down a 47.12 split on the second leg to move the Americans to the front, until he handed the youngster Ryan Held (47.73) and veteran Nathan Adrian their relay duties at the remaining exchanges of the race. Adrian delivered a fastest split in the field with an anchor of 46.97 to race against the Frenchmen towards a gold-medal finish in 3:09.92. Phelps had officially come out of retirement two years earlier to extend his career resume with a nineteenth gold medal and twenty-third overall at his fifth straight Olympics.

France's Mehdy Metella (48.08), Fabien Gilot (48.20), and Florent Manaudou (47.14) handed Jérémy Stravius the anchor duties to chase down the Americans to the front, but Stravius' split of 47.11 was just good enough to settle them only for the silver in 3:10.53. Meanwhile, the Australian combination of James Roberts (48.88), Kyle Chalmers (47.38), James Magnussen (48.11), and Cameron McEvoy (47.00) snatched the bronze in 3:11.37 to hold off the Russian quartet of Andrey Grechin (48.68), Danila Izotov (48.00), Vladimir Morozov (47.31), and Alexander Sukhorukov (47.65) by nearly three tenths of a second, a fourth-place time in 3:11.64.

Outside the podium, Brazil's Marcelo Chierighini (48.12), Nicolas Oliveira (48.26), Gabriel Santos (48.72), and João de Lucca (48.11) enjoyed racing in front of the home crowd to pick up the fifth spot with a 3:13.21. The Belgian foursome of Glenn Surgeloose (48.73), Jasper Aerents (48.47), Emmanuel Vanluchene (48.82), and Pieter Timmers (47.55) struggled to mount a challenge against the top-ranked teams throughout the race, but they managed to finish sixth with a national record of 3:13.57. Canada (3:14.35) and Japan (3:14.48) rounded out the championship field.

The medals for the competition were presented by Ivan Dibos, Peru, IOC member, and the gifts were presented by Mr. Errol Clarke, Bureau Member of the FINA.

Records
Prior to this competition, the existing world and Olympic records were as follows.

Competition format

The competition consisted of two rounds: heats and a final. The relay teams with the best 8 times in the heats advanced to the final. Swim-offs were used as necessary to break ties for advancement to the next round.

Results

Heats
A total of sixteen countries qualified to participate. The best eight from two heats advanced to the final.

Final

References

Men's 4 x 100 metre freestyle relay
Olympics
Men's events at the 2016 Summer Olympics